The Mayoral election of 1933 in Pittsburgh, Pennsylvania was held on Tuesday, November 6, 1933. In a realigning election, Democrats regained control of the mayor's office for the first time in 28 years; they have not relinquished this position since. The incumbent mayor, John Herron of the Republican Party chose to run for his first full term. Herron had been elevated to the executive office from his position as city council president after Charles H. Kline resigned over a fiscal scandal; he inherited a party whose once efficient machinery was in crisis. Democrats, led by new powerful grassroots organizer David Lawrence (a future mayor) selected William McNair, an idealistic and outspoken attorney as their candidate. With the beginnings of the New Deal being set into place, Pittsburgh's strong labor community moved rapidly toward the Democrats, creating a huge shift in voting patterns and allowing McNair to win.

Primary elections

Incumbent mayor John Herron won a divided Republican Primary against Councilman Peter J. McArdle and Register of Wills Joseph Mackrell.

William McNair won the Democratic Primary.

General election
A total of 179,425 votes were cast.

Herron received 75,405 votes on the Republican ticket, 258 on the Citizens' Party ticket, and 11 on non-partisan ballots.
†Mackrell received 154 votes on Liberal Party and 101 on Square Deal Party ballots.

External links
Newspaper description of election
The Washington Reporter - Google News Archive Search

References

1933 Pennsylvania elections
1933
1933 United States mayoral elections
1930s in Pittsburgh
November 1933 events in the United States